Pat Reidy (born 15 March 1971) is an Australian basketball player. He competed in the men's tournament at the 1996 Summer Olympics.

References

External links
 

1971 births
Living people
Australian men's basketball players
Basketball players at the 1996 Summer Olympics
North Melbourne Giants players
Olympic basketball players of Australia
Basketball players from Melbourne
1994 FIBA World Championship players